Elise Rasoamampionona was a Malagasy politician. In 1964 she was elected to the National Assembly, becoming its first female member. In 1970 she was the first woman appointed to the cabinet when she became Secretary of State for the Welfare of Women and Children.

Biography
Rasoamampionona joined the Social Democratic Party and became head of its women's section. Following the death of Stéphenson Rajaona in December 1963, Rasoamampionona was the only candidate to contest the resulting by-election for the 6th constituency in January 1964. She was elected with 397,985 of the 433,000 registered voters voting for her, becoming the first female member of the legislature. She was re-elected from the 5th constituency in the 1965 elections, and became deputy leader of the party. In 1970 she became the first female minister in Madagascar, when she was appointed Secretary of State for the Welfare of Women and Children.

Her son Elise Razaka later served as Minister of Energy and Mines.

References

Members of the National Assembly (Madagascar)
Malagasy women in politics
Government ministers of Madagascar
Social Democratic Party of Madagascar politicians
Year of birth unknown
Year of death unknown